Björn Nils Olof Skifs (born 20 April 1947) is a Swedish singer, songwriter, actor, and screenwriter.

Career
Björn Skifs formed his first musical group, Slam Creepers, in 1962. Slam Creepers split in 1969 and Skifs went on to form a new band, Blåblus (a farmer's or workman's shirt (blus, blouse) made from blue (blå, blue) fabric - a pun (blues)) in 1972. As the lead singer of Blue Swede (another pun - blue + suede), the band had a No. 1 hit on Billboard Hot 100 in 1974 with a cover of Mark James's "Hooked on a Feeling". 

Skifs embarked on a solo career after Slam Creepers broke up in 1969 and previously he had recorded the duet Med varann with Anni-Frid Lyngstad for his 1975 album Schiffz!. Skifs appeared as The Arbiter on the original studio album for Chess, released in 1984. A single and video, The Arbiter (I Know the Score), was released in 1985. Skifs also recorded several demos for the album, including One Night in Bangkok, later performed by Murray Head. Skifs did not perform the role on stage (in the original London production the character was played by Tom Jobe).

Povel Ramel gave Skifs the Karamelodiktstipendiet award in 1984. 

Skifs has represented Sweden twice in the Eurovision Song Contest, in the 1978 contest and in the 1981 contest. In 2000, he hosted Melodifestivalen, the Swedish heat of the Eurovision Song Contest, along with nine other presenters.

In 2002, he had a major hit with the song "Håll mitt hjärta" (Hold My Heart), which is a Swedish version of Peter Hallströms song Same Ol' Story. It stayed on Svensktoppen from 27 April 2003 until 8 January 2006, for a total of 142 weeks. In April 2020, Skifs performed at the Swedish live-show En kväll tillsammans, broadcast on SVT, which aimed to bring in money to the Swedish COVID-19 risk groups. Skifs performed the song "Håll Mitt Hjärta" at the end of the show.

Discography

Albums

EP/Singles
 1973 – "Sally var en reko brud"
 1973 – "Hooked on a Feeling"
 1973 – "Never My Love"
 1973 – "Silly Milly"
 1975 – "Michaelangelo"
 1976 – "Firefly"
 1977 – "Lady"
 1977 – "Tarantula"
 1978 – "Det blir alltid värre framåt natten"
 1978 – "Rococo rendez-vous"
 1981 – "Fångad i en dröm"
 1985 – "Vild och vacker"
 1985 – "The Arbiter (I Know the Score)"
 1991 – "Om igen"
 2010 – "When You Tell the World You're Mine" with Agnes Carlsson
 2011 – "Break the Spell"
 2012 – "Step Right Up"

Collections
 1978 – Björns bästa / Björn Skifs' Greatest Hits
 1981 – Björns ballader
 1989 – Collection
 1990 – Björn Skifs
 1991 – Songs for you
 1997 – 50/50
 2004 – Skifs Hits!

Filmography
 Drömkåken (1993) a.k.a. The Dream House
 Joker (1991)
 Strul (1988) a.k.a. Framed
 Smugglarkungen (1985) a.k.a. King of Smugglers
 Chess Moves
 Privatdeckarna: Uppdrag Gran Canaria (1984)
 Prima Veras saga om Olav den hellige (1983)
 En flicka på halsen (1982) a.k.a. Saddled with a Girl
 Sverige åt svenskarna (1980) a.k.a. Battle of Sweden, a.k.a. Sweden for the Swedes, a.k.a. The Drinking Man's War
 Toy Story (Swedish voice of Woody)
 Toy Story 2 (Swedish voice of Woody)

Notes

References

External links

Björn Skifs Official site (archived 2005)
Björn Skifs at Blixten & Co agency (archived 2009)

1947 births
Living people
People from Vansbro Municipality
Eurovision Song Contest entrants of 1978
Melodifestivalen contestants
Melodifestivalen winners
Eurovision Song Contest entrants for Sweden
Swedish male actors
Swedish male singers
Swedish-language singers
Capitol Records artists
EMI Records artists
Eurovision Song Contest entrants of 1981
Artists from Dalarna
English-language singers from Sweden
Blue Swede members